The black-chested mountain tanager (Cnemathraupis eximia) is a species of bird in the family Thraupidae.

It is found in Colombia, Ecuador, Peru, and Venezuela. Its natural habitat is subtropical or tropical moist montane forests.

This species was formerly included in the genus Buthraupis. When a molecular phylogenetic study published in 2010 found that Buthraupis was polyphyletic, the black-chested mountain tanager was moved to the resurrected genus Cnemathraupis.

References

black-chested mountain tanager
Birds of the Colombian Andes
Birds of the Ecuadorian Andes
black-chested mountain tanager
Taxonomy articles created by Polbot